uswsusp, abbreviated from userspace software suspend and stylized as µswsusp, is a set of userspace command-line utilities for Linux that act primarily as wrappers around the Linux kernel hibernation functionality and implement sleep mode ( utility, referred to as "suspend to RAM"), hibernation ( utility, referred to as "suspend to disk"), and hybrid sleep ( utility, referred to as "suspend to both"). It supports Linux kernel versions 2.6.17 and newer.

uswsusp supports image checksumming, data compression, disk encryption, and integration with Splashy and fbsplash.

References

External links 
 
 Launchpad page

Linux
Linux-only free software